Modelbane Europa is a model railway attraction in Hadsten, Denmark,  and one of the largest of its kind in Europe, built by a local foundation. In November 2014, the railway consisted of at least 1,100 metres (3,609 ft) of track in HO scale, divided into two sections: Denmark and Germany. The model takes 150 m² (1,614 sq ft) of floorspace.

References

External links 
 Modelbane Europa - official site in English

Tourist attractions in Denmark
Model railroads
1996 establishments in Denmark
Hadsten